Sesia may refer to:
 The river Sesia, in northwest Italy
 Sesia (département), a district during the First French Empire, named after the river
 Sesia, a genus of moths
 The Valsesia, the river’s valley
 Georges Sesia, French footballer